Finkolo is a village and rural commune in the Cercle of Sikasso in the Sikasso Region of southern Mali. The commune covers an area of 477 square kilometers and includes 11 villages. In the 2009 census it had a population of 22,429.

References

External links
.

Communes of Sikasso Region